Pyrsarcha is a genus of moths belonging to the subfamily Tortricinae of the family Tortricidae. It contains only one species, Pyrsarcha hypsicrates, which is found in Kashmir.

See also
List of Tortricidae genera

References

External links

tortricidae.com

Archipini
Taxa named by Edward Meyrick
Monotypic moth genera
Moths described in 1932
Moths of Asia
Tortricidae genera